Falling Star is a 2014 Spanish historical film directed by Lluís Miñarro which stars Alex Brendemühl as King Amadeo. It features dialogue in Catalan and Spanish.

Plot 
Including surrealist elements and erotic scenes and starting in 1870, the plot follows the ill reign of Amadeo, King of Spain and his attempts to modernize an ungovernable country.

Cast

Production 
The film is an Eddie Saeta production. It was shot in Barcelona and southern Italy.

Release 
The film made its world premiere at the 2014 International Film Festival Rotterdam. It was theatrically released in Spain on 30 May 2014.

Reception 
Jay Weissberg of Variety pointed out that the helmer is interested in "a surreal-absurdist mood piece wedded to camp aesthetics", with the film resulting rather in to "a hothouse fantasy rather than a historical biopic".

Neil Young of The Hollywood Reporter summed up the film as "a royal treat: crisply sumptuous, wryly offbeat glimpses into an obscure Spanish monarch's ill-fated reign.".

Daniel de Partearroyo of Cinemanía rated the film 3½ out of 5 stars, considering that Brendemühl is "exultant and hilarious".

Accolades 

|-
| align = "center" rowspan = "2" | 2014 || rowspan = "2" | 1st Fénix Awards || Best Actor || Alex Brendemühl ||  || rowspan = "2" | 
|-
| Best Art Direction || Sebastián Vogler || 
|-
| rowspan = "13" align = "center" | 2015 || rowspan = "13" | 7th Gaudí Awards || colspan = "2" | Best Film ||  || rowspan = "13" | 
|-
| Best Director || Lluís Miñarro || 
|-
| Best Screenplay || Lluís Miñarro, Sergi Belbel || 
|-
| Best Actor || Àlex Brendemühl ||  
|-
| Best Actress || Bárbara Lennie || 
|-
| rowspan = "2" | Best Supporting Actor || Àlex Batllori || 
|-
| Francesc Garrido || 
|-
| Best Art Direction || Sebastián Vogler || 
|-
| Best Editing || Núria Esquerra || 
|-
| Best Cinematography || Jimmy Gimferrer || 
|-
| Best Costume Design || Núria Esquerra || 
|-
| Best Sound || Dani Fontrodona, Alejandro Castillo, Ricard Casals || 
|-
| Best Makeup and Hairstyles || Ignasi Ruiz || 
|}

See also 
 List of Spanish films of 2014

References 

Films set in 1870
Films set in Spain
2010s Catalan-language films
2010s Spanish-language films
2010s Spanish films
Films shot in Barcelona
Films shot in Italy
Spanish historical drama films
2010s historical drama films